HMS Barfleur was a 90-gun second rate ship of the line of the Royal Navy, launched at Deptford Dockyard on 10 August 1697.

She was rebuilt according to the 1706 Establishment at Deptford, relaunching on 27 June 1716. 

She took part in the Battle of Cape Passaro in 1719, and then served during the War of 1739–48, including the Battle of Toulon in 1744, before being paid off in 1745. However, the Barfleur was reduced to an 80-gun third rate in 1755 and served throughout the Seven Years' War, prior to being hulked in 1764, and eventually broken up in 1783.

Notes

References

Lavery, Brian (2003) The Ship of the Line - Volume 1: The development of the battlefleet 1650–1850. Conway Maritime Press. .
Winfield, Rif (2007) British Warships in the Age of Sail 1714–1792: Design, Construction, Careers and Fates. Seaforth Publishing. .

Ships of the line of the Royal Navy
1690s ships